Lard na (Lao: ລາດໜ້າ ; also spelled lad na, lard nar and lard nah) is a Lao-Chinese noodle dish covered in gravy that was made popular as a street food by Chinese living in Laos.

This dish is made with stir-fried wide rice noodles and either chicken, beef, pork, or tofu. The most common version includes vegetables such as Chinese kailan and straw mushrooms. However, broccoli is also commonly used if kailan is unavailable. Common seasonings include sweet soy sauce, fish sauce ("nam pa"), sugar, garlic, and black pepper.

See also

 Rat na, the Thai counterpart

Laotian noodle dishes